The Bukidnon State University Chorale is the premier cultural group of the Bukidnon State University specializing in Bukidnon indigenous music. It is a mixed choir composed of students and employees of the institution.

The choir represented the Philippines for the 2011 Prague Quadrennial of Performance Design and Space in Prague, Czech Republic on June 16–26, 2011. They also performed at the inauguration of the exhibition of traditional Philippine garments at the Blumentritt-Rizal Bastion in Litoměřice, Czech Republic. They also participated in two celebrations marking the Philippines’ 113th Independence Day in Prague, with a diplomatic reception at the Hotel Hilton Celnice and at the Shrine of the Holy Infant Jesus. The chorale unleashed its boundless gifts of talents and brought Philippines to the world stage at through music and dance for the 150th Birthday Celebration of Dr. Jose Rizal at Náměstí Republiky in Prague.
 
The group is the resident performer at the "Piniliyapan" Cultural Night of the annual Kaamulan Festival in Bukidnon.

Performances

International

 Prague Quadrennial Performance Design and Space 2011
Prague, Czech Republic
June 2011

113th Philippine Independence Day Diplomatic Reception
Hilton Hotel, Prague, Czech Republic
June 2011

113th Philippine Independence Day
Shrine of the Holy Infant Jesus
Czech Republic
June 2011

150th Birthday Celebration of Dr. Jose Rizal
Namesti Republiky
Prague, Czech Republic
June 2011

Traditional Philippine Garments Exhibit
Blumentritt-Rizal Bastion, Litomerice, Czech Republic
June 2011

Philippine Embassy
Prague, Czech Republic
June 2011

Botsshaft der Philippinen, Philippine Embassy
Vienna, Austria
July 2011

Local

Bukidnon State University Chorale in Concert
Bukidnon State University Auditorium, Malaybalay City
September 28, 2011

Reception for His Excellency William Cocks
Assistant of Cultural Affairs of the United States of America in the Philippines
Malaybalay City
July 2011

“Sing Unto the Lord, a Thanksgiving Concert”
The Monastery of the Transfiguration, San Jose, Malaybalay City
August 2011

BSU Chorale in Concert
Iligan City
April 2011

Pasundayag 2011
Mall of Asia, Pasay
April 2011

Songs from Kitanglad
Siliman University, Dumaguete City
January 2010

Piniliyapan, Glimpses of Bukidnon 2010 and 2011
Malaybalay City
March 2010 & 2011

ASEAN Festival for Culture and the Arts
Clark Expo, Pampanga
March 2010

KALAHI Cultural Caregiving
Intramuros, Manila
March 2010

Mid-Year PASUC Conference
Grand Men Seng Hotel, Davao City
June 2010

Annual Malaybalay Choral Directors Guild Choral Festival (1st-7th)
Malaybalay City
November

Pasundayag 2009
Clamshell, Intramuros, Manila
May 2009

Department of Foreign Affairs
Roxas Blvd., Pasay, Metro Manila
July 2008

Cebu Normal University
Cebu city
December 2008

Reception for His Excellency Gerard Chesner
Ambassador of France to the Philippines
July 2006

Recognitions
 Champion
Mindanao Association of State Tertiary Schools Incorporated 2014 (March) Choral Competition*
March 2014, Bukidnon State University, Malaybalay City

Champion
Mindanao Association of State Colleges and Universities Foundation 2008 Choral Competition
February 2008, Bukidnon State University, Malaybalay City

 Champion
Mindanao Association of State Colleges and Universities Foundation 2006 Choral Competition**
February 2006, University of Southern Mindanao, Kabacan, North Cotabato

 1st Runner-up
Philippine Association of State Universities and Colleges Cultural Literacy Festival 2008 Choral Competition
July 2008, Philippine Normal University, Taft Avenue, Manila

 1st Runner-up
Philippine Association of State Universities and Colleges Cultural Literacy Festival 2006 Choral Competition
July 2006, Bulacan State University, Malolos, Bulacan

*There were two competitions held by the Mindanao Association of State Tertiary Schools Incorporated in 2014. One was in March 2014 held at Malaybalay City, Bukidnon; while the second one was on November 2014 held at Mati City, Davao Oriental. It was also the former Mindanao Association of State Universities and Colleges and Universities Foundation which was rebranded at the same year.

**Tied with University of Southern Mindanao Chorale in 2006

Choir Director

Mercibelle Barroso-Abejuela earned her bachelor's degree in Music at the University of Santo Tomas in Manila.  She was a full scholar of the late jeweler Ms. Fe S. Panlilio and her son Mr. Gabriel S. Panlilio.  She majored in Voice Performance under Ms. Rachelle Gerodias, Professor Gloria D. Coronel, and the late Maestra Salvacion Oppus-Yniguez.  She had been under the chorus classes of Professor Dick Mazo and Professor Fidel Calalang Jr.  She has performed at the Cultural Center of the Philippines with the University of Santo Tomas Conservatory of Music Chorus.  Also at the CCP, she has performed as Neneng in the Opera Abal Santo Niňo  by Fr. Manuel Maramba.  In 1999, she pursued her dream to serve the people in her province as a music director.  She joined the Bukidnon State University as a music teacher, and in 2001 was appointed as the choral director of the University.  She has attended choral conducting workshops with Jonathan Velasco, Eudenice Palaruan, Mark Carpio, Anna Tabitha Piquero, to name a few.  Being a native of Bukidnon, she has envisioned the Bukidnon State University Chorale to become the premiere cultural group of the Bukidnon State University specializing in Bukidnon Indigenous Music.  This earned her one of the credits to be accorded the rank of Bae, her tribal name being Kahukdungan Bae Manlilimbay, which means ”an educator and a singer.”

References

External links 

 
Bukidnon State University

Culture of Bukidnon
Filipino choirs
University choirs
Musical groups established in 2001
2001 establishments in the Philippines